William Nelson (1711 – November 19, 1772) was an American planter, politician, and colonial leader from Yorktown, Virginia. In the interim between the royal governors Norborne Berkeley and Lord Dunmore, he served as governor of colonial Virginia in 1770 and 1771.

Nelson was the son of Thomas "Scotch Tom" Nelson, the immigrant ancestor from Cumbria, who built Nelson House at his plantation in about 1730.

In the years leading up to the American Revolution, Nelson was an active supporter of the Patriot cause. Among his children was his son, Thomas Nelson Jr., who was active in revolutionary politics, one of thirteen representatives who drafted the Articles of Confederation, a signer of the Declaration of Independence, and a future governor of the Commonwealth of Virginia in the new United States of America.

His children (in order of age) Reverend Samuel Nelson; Amos Nelson; Mary Nelson; Ebenezer Nelson; Gen. Thomas Nelson, signer of the "Declaration of Independence"; Keranhappuch Nelson Biard; Robert Nelson; Dr Nathaniel Nelson; Col. Hugh Nelson; Hon. William Nelson, Jr; Elizabeth Nelson Thompson; James Alexander Nelson and Robert Nelson remained important in aristocratic society after his passing.

References

1711 births
1772 deaths
Colonial governors of Virginia
American people of English descent
Nelson family of Virginia
People from Yorktown, Virginia
American planters
American slave owners